Heinrich Poselger (25 December 1818 – 4 October 1883) was a German botanist who specialized in studies of succulent plants.

From 1849 to 1851 he collected plants, especially cacti, along the U.S.-Mexico border, and in the process took part in the United States and Mexican Boundary Survey. His collections of cacti were sent to the herbarium at Jena. He was a resident of Berlin, where he maintained an impressive collection of succulents.

He is the taxonomic authority of numerous species within the family Cactaceae, and has a number of cacti species bearing his name, a few examples being Coryphantha poselgeriana, Echinocereus poselgeri and Mammillaria poselgeri.

Associated works 
 Reise nach Mexico in den Jahren, (1849). 
 Beitrag zur Kakteenkunde. in "Allgemeine Gartenzeitung", (1853).
 Hundert Jahre der St. Johannis-Loge zum Widder (in Berlin) von 1777 bis 1877, (1877).
 "Heinrich Poselger: cactus articles in Allgemeine Gartenzeitung 1853-1855" (with Christoph Friedrich Otto and Albert Gottfried Dietrich); Cactusville Press.

References 

1818 births
1883 deaths
19th-century German botanists
Scientists from Berlin